†Ferussinidae is an extinct family of operculate freshwater snails, aquatic gastropod mollusks in the informal group Architaenioglossa.

References 

 The Taxonomicon

Prehistoric gastropods